Colin Higgins (28 July 1941 – 5 August 1988) was an Australian-American screenwriter, actor, director, and producer. He was best known for writing the screenplay for the 1971 film Harold and Maude, and for directing the films Foul Play (1978) and 9 to 5 (1980).

Life and career

Early life
Higgins was born in Nouméa, New Caledonia, France, to an Australian mother, Joy (Kelly), and American father, John Edward Higgins, one of six sons. Higgins' father enlisted in the army following the attack on Pearl Harbor, and his mother returned to her home in Sydney with Colin and his elder brother. Apart from a brief stint in San Francisco in 1945, Higgins lived in Sydney until 1957, mostly in the suburb of Hunters Hill, attending school at Saint Ignatius' College, Riverview.

After moving to Redwood City, California, Higgins attended Stanford University for a year, but then lost his scholarship because he became "obsessed" with theatre. He moved to New York and hung around the Actors Studio but could not find work, so he became a page at the ABC television studios. He lost hope at becoming an actor and enlisted in the U.S. Army, where he was sent to Germany and worked for Stars and Stripes newspaper.

Higgins was discharged in 1965, spent six months in Europe, mostly in Paris, then returned to Stanford University to study a Bachelor of Arts in Creative Writing. Higgins later said, "after I had traveled and worked for a while I was anxious to study for the sake of studying. I took courses for what they were, not so that I could sleep in."

While at college Higgins supported himself as an actor, playing in small theatre productions, including acting in a sex farce called Once Over Nightly for a year and a half. He wrote a play Once Around the Quad which was performed at Stanford after he left.

Hollywood
After Higgins graduated from Stanford he got a job as an able-bodied seaman "because I wanted to see the Orient. It didn't take me long to realize that the days of Conrad and Eugene O'Neill were over. There was no work and too many people to do it."

He visited Expo 67 in Montreal and was inspired by the film exhibits there and decided to learn about film. He began working on a Master of Fine Arts in screenwriting at UCLA, where his classmates included Paul Schrader. While there he made two short films, Opus One (1968), a satire on student films, and Retreat, an anti-war statement. His M.F.A. thesis would serve as the basis for Harold and Maude (1971).

Harold and Maude
After graduating he went to work for a wealthy family in Los Angeles as a part-time chauffeur and pool cleaner in exchange for free accommodation, where he met film producer Ed Lewis. Higgins showed a draft of Harold and Maude to Lewis, who then showed it to Robert Evans at Paramount. Higgins wanted to direct the script himself and was allowed to shoot a director's test for $7,000 but Paramount was not sufficiently impressed, and Hal Ashby was hired. Higgins collaborated well with Ashby and both were pleased with the final film, but it was not a large box-office success on original release.

Higgins got an offer to write a Movie of the Week for TV, The Devil's Daughter (1972), which he later described as "just a job". He also wrote a TV movie, The Distributor, which was not made, and a feature film script, Killing Lydia, which would later become the basis for his 1978 film Foul Play. He then received an offer from Jean-Louis Barrault in Paris to turn Harold and Maude into a play for French actor Madeleine Renaud. Higgins did so, working on the French translation with Jean-Claude Carrière, and the play ran for seven years. The film of Harold and Maude continued to run in cinemas around the world, where by 1983 it was in profit. (The same year it was estimated Higgins had earned $1 million from his script and productions of the play.)

While in Paris, Higgins met theatre director Peter Brook and worked with him as playwright-in-residence for his company. They did a play about mountain people in Uganda called The Ik which ran in Paris, London and New York. The producers of The Devil's Daughter hired Higgins to write a Hitchcock-style thriller. This became Silver Streak (1976), which was a hit under the direction of Arthur Hiller. Higgins later said if he had directed it he would have been "a bit less faithful to the writer; I would have slashed away."

Director
The success of Silver Streak enabled Higgins to revive his earlier script, Foul Play (1978), and direct the film himself. It was enormously popular at the box office and launched his directing career.

He was writing a comedy-thriller, The Man Who Lost Tuesday when he received an offer to re-write and direct 9 to 5 (1980). It was a big hit, as was the musical The Best Little Whorehouse in Texas (1982), which Higgins directed.

He was meant to follow it with The Man Who Lost Tuesday but Paramount felt the budget was too high and passed.

In 1985, he was working on a project with playwright Jonathan Reynolds. In 1986, he was reportedly writing a script, Washington Girls, as a vehicle to reunite Jane Fonda, Lily Tomlin and Dolly Parton.

His last credit was a TV movie, Out on a Limb (1987), which he co-wrote and co-produced.

Legacy and Death

Higgins, who was openly gay, died of an AIDS-related illness at his home on August 5, 1988 at the age of 47. The Colin Higgins Foundation was established in 1986 to provide support for gay and transgender youth. It was established by Higgins following his diagnosis with HIV in 1985. His writing is said to have inspired filmmakers like Judd Apatow, Seth Rogen, Wes Anderson and Paul Feig.

His brother is Australian actor John Higgins.

Filmography

Film

Actor

Unmade screenplays
The Man Who Lost Tuesday – a comedy thriller set in Paris
First Lady – a satire on politics to star Lily Tomlin

Theatre
Harold and Maude (1972)
The Ik (1975)

References

External links

 The Colin Higgins Foundation
 
 
 
Finding aid for the Colin Higgins Papers

1941 births
1988 deaths
People from Nouméa
AIDS-related deaths in California
American male film actors
American film producers
American film directors
American male screenwriters
American people of Australian descent
American gay actors
American gay writers
American LGBT screenwriters
LGBT film directors
Stanford University alumni
UCLA Film School alumni
20th-century American male actors
20th-century American businesspeople
20th-century American male writers
20th-century American screenwriters
20th-century LGBT people